James Henry Elmore (January 6, 1843 – June 1, 1914) was mayor of Green Bay, Wisconsin.

Biography
Elmore was born James Henry Elmore on January 6, 1843, in Mukwonago, Wisconsin. He attended Racine College and first moved to Green Bay in 1863. After spending a number of years traveling, he settled in Fort Howard, Wisconsin before returning to Green Bay in 1883. He married Anna Leola Chapman. They had one son. Elmore died in 1914.

Career
Elmore served as an alderman in and Mayor of Fort Howard. He later served as Mayor of Green Bay from 1890 to 1895. Elmore was a Democrat.

References

People from Mukwonago, Wisconsin
Wisconsin city council members
Mayors of Green Bay, Wisconsin
Wisconsin Democrats
1843 births
1914 deaths
19th-century American politicians